Jorge Félix Muñoz García (born 22 August 1991) is a Spanish professional footballer who plays as a left winger for Polish club Piast Gliwice.

Club career
Born in Madrid, Félix graduated from the youth academy of Atlético Madrid, but only represented its C team as a senior. He went on to feature for CDC Moscardó, Getafe CF B, AD Alcorcón B and CF Trival Valderas, in both Segunda División B and Tercera División.

On 24 June 2015, Félix signed with third-tier club CF Rayo Majadahonda. He made his competitive debut 23 August, coming on as a 66th-minute substitute for Álex García in a 0–0 away draw against CD Mensajero. Having been his team's top scorer during the 2016–17 season with eight goals, he was released in June.

Félix joined Lleida Esportiu of the same league on 27 June 2017. On 20 August he scored his first goal for them, in a 1–1 draw at CF Badalona. During his spell at the Camp d'Esports, he netted ten times from 43 matches.

On 2 July 2018, Félix moved abroad after agreeing to a two-year contract with Polish side Piast Gliwice. He made his debut in top-flight football late in the month, starting in a 2–1 Ekstraklasa away win over Zagłębie Sosnowiec.

On 2 August 2022, after a two-year stint in Turkey with Sivasspor, Félix returned to Piast, signing a one-year contract with an extension option.

Career statistics

Club

Honours
Piast Gliwice
Ekstraklasa: 2018–19

Sivasspor
 Turkish Cup: 2021–22

Individual
Ekstraklasa Player of the Season: 2019–20

References

External links

1991 births
Living people
Spanish footballers
Footballers from Madrid
Association football wingers
Segunda División B players
Tercera División players
Ekstraklasa players
Süper Lig players
Atlético Madrid C players
Getafe CF B players
AD Alcorcón B players
CF Trival Valderas players
CF Rayo Majadahonda players
Lleida Esportiu footballers
Piast Gliwice players
Sivasspor footballers
Spanish expatriate footballers
Expatriate footballers in Poland
Expatriate footballers in Turkey
Spanish expatriate sportspeople in Poland
Spanish expatriate sportspeople in Turkey